Pavlová is a village and municipality in the Nové Zámky District in the Nitra Region of south-west Slovakia.

History
In historical records the village was first mentioned in 1135, under the name Pauli.

Geography
The municipality lies at an altitude of 137 metres and covers an area of 7.617 km2. It has a population of about 275 people.

Ethnicity
The population is about 95% Hungarian and 5% Slovak.

Facilities
The village has a small public library and a football pitch. The Roman Catholic church of St. Lawrence was founded in the village in 1810.

References

External links
https://web.archive.org/web/20080111223415/http://www.statistics.sk/mosmis/eng/run.html 
Pavlová – Nové Zámky Okolie

Villages and municipalities in Nové Zámky District